El disco de oro de Flor Silvestre (Flor Silvestre's Gold Record) is a greatest hits album by Mexican singer Flor Silvestre, released in 1977 by Musart Records.

Track listing
Side one

Side two

External links
 El disco de oro de Flor Silvestre at WorldCat

1977 greatest hits albums
Spanish-language compilation albums
Flor Silvestre albums